Forever Halloween is the fourth full-length album by American rock band The Maine, released on June 4, 2013, through 8123 Records. The album received generally positive reviews from critics. The album spawned two singles: "Happy" and "Ugly on the Inside".

Background and recording
In October and November 2012, the group went on a co-headlining US tour with Mayday Parade. Following the tour's conclusion, the group began working on their next album.

The album, produced by Brendan Benson of The Raconteurs, is the band's second consecutive self-funded release following their departure from Warner Bros. Records. "To be seen and treated as an equal by someone you hold in high regard is a gratifying and refreshing feeling," says frontman John O'Callaghan on working with Benson. "[He] opened his studio doors, did that and much more which helped provide the platform to create an album we can now all stand behind." The group posted a studio update video on February 13. Throughout the month and March, the group constantly posted studio update videos. On March 9, the group announced they had finished recording. On April 4, it was announced that the album was mixed and mastered.

Release
On April 12, Forever Halloween was announced for release in June. In addition, the album's artwork was revealed. On April 16, "Happy" was made available for streaming. On May 7, a lyric video was released for "Love and Drugs". The track was also available as a free download. On May 23, a behind-the-scenes video on the making of the album was posted online. The album was released on June 4. It was released in the US in partnership with the group's management team Eighty One Twenty Three, and Rude Records internationally. On the same day, a music video was released for "These Four Words". In June and July, the group went on the 8123 tour in North America alongside A Rocket to the Moon, This Century and Brighten. In September, the group went on a tour of Australia with Anberlin and William Beckett. On September 13, a music video was released for "Love & Drugs".

In October and November, the group embarked on a co-headlining US tour with Anberlin. They were supported by Lydia and From Indian Lakes. In April 2014, the group went on a tour of the UK with Deaf Havana. In May, the group embarked on a South American tour with Nick Santino. On May 21, "Ugly on the Inside" was made available for streaming. Between June and August, the group went on Warped Tour across the US. On June 8, the group released a video on the creation of the album's artwork. "So Criminal" was made available for streaming on June 14. On June 17,the band released a deluxe version of the album with five additional bonus tracks. Physical copies of this edition were sold exclusively on Warped Tour. Preceded by a teaser trailer, a music video was released for "Run" on August 11.

Reception

The album sold over 10,000 copies in its first week debuting at number 39 on the Billboard 200, and has sold 26,000 copies as of March 2015.

Forever Halloween has received mostly positive feedback from music critics. At Metacritic, they assign a "weighted average" rating out of 100 to selected independent ratings and reviews from mainstream critics, and the album has received a Metascore of a 72, based on 4 reviews, indicating "generally favorable reviews." Gregory Heaney of AllMusic rated the album three stars out of five, writing that the album "(Strikes) just the right balance between melancholy and wistfulness, (evoking) nostalgia without feeling overly sentimental as it takes a contemplative stroll down memory lane with a city-meets-country sound that feels inspired by the more pop-leaning moments of bands like Wilco and the Old 97's."

Track listing

Personnel
Members
 John O'Callaghan – lead vocals, piano
 Jared Monaco – lead guitar
 Kennedy Brock – rhythm guitar, vocals
 Garrett Nickelsen – bass guitar
 Patrick Kirch – drums, percussion

Production
 Bucky Baxter – pedal steel
 Brendan Benson – producer
 Andrew Higley – pump organ
 Tim Kirch – art direction, concept, layout
 Dirk Mai – art direction, concept, photography
 The Maine – composer, primary artist
 Mike Esser – engineer, percussion
 Matthew Van Gasbeck – composer
 Mark Watrous – backing vocals
 Colby Wedgeworth – mastering, mixing

Charts

References

External links

Forever Halloween at YouTube (streamed copy where licensed)

2013 albums
The Maine (band) albums